Nunton is a settlement on Benbecula in the Outer Hebrides, Scotland. Nunton is within the parish of South Uist, and is situated on the B892.

References

External links

Canmore - South Uist, Benbecula, Nunton Steading site record
Canmore - Benbecula, Nunton, Ruin of St Mary's Chapel site record
Canmore - Benbecula, Nunton, 'The Mermaid's Grave' site record
Canmore - Benbecula, Dun Torcusay site record

Villages in the Outer Hebrides
Benbecula